Dark Souls: Artorias of the Abyss is a downloadable content pack for the 2011 action role-playing game Dark Souls. Developed by FromSoftware and published by Namco Bandai Games, it released as part of the Prepare to Die Edition version of the game for Windows in August 2012. The pack was later sold separately for the PlayStation 3 and Xbox 360 versions of the game two months later.

Artorias of the Abyss takes the player a hundred years into Dark Souls past, where they must save the land of Oolacile from destruction at the hands of Manus, Father of the Abyss. The pack received positive reviews from critics, who praised the boss battles and additional story and gameplay content.

Gameplay 

Dark Souls is an action role-playing game in which the player controls a customized character whose appearance and skills are determined by the player. The game requires the player to explore areas and progress through them by fighting bosses at certain points. Artorias of the Abyss adds a new area, Oolacile, that can be accessed after obtaining the "Broken Pendant" item.

The area includes four bosses and other optional miniboss fights. It also introduces many new weapon and armor items that can then be used in the main game, as well as new shopkeepers and additional upgrade material for the player's weapons. A multiplayer arena was included that allows for more structured PvP and includes online leaderboards.

Plot 
Artorias of the Abyss is set a hundred years before the events of Dark Souls. The player is taken back into the past by a primeval human known as Manus, Father of the Abyss, who was resurrected and tortured by the sorcerers of Oolacile a century prior, hoping to unlock his dark power. Manus' power went wild and created the Abyss, a dark void that threatens to swallow the entirety of Oolacile. Anor Londo sent Knight Artorias to slay Manus, but he was unable to withstand the dark onslaught due to his lack of Humanity and became possessed himself, only able to save his wolf companion, Sif.

The player, due to their Humanity, is better able to fight off the darkness, and must defeat the possessed Artorias. They must then descend through Oolacile Township and into the Chasm of the Abyss, where they take on Manus and rescue the land's ruler, Princess Dusk. An additional, optional fight involves defeating the black dragon Kalameet that is menacing Oolacile, with the assistance of Hawkeye Gough, a giant archer who was one of the Four Knights of Gwyn.

Development 
According to director Hidetaka Miyazaki, Artorias of the Abyss was originally conceived during the development of Dark Souls, and was planned to be part of the main game but was scrapped early on, The character of Dusk of Oolacile was left in the game as a merchant. The concept was revisited following the game's release, as rescuing Dusk was made a pre-requisite to unlock access to it.

Reception 

Artorias of the Abyss received generally positive reviews, according to review aggregator Metacritic. Eurogamer rated it 9/10, calling it a "tightly-wound adventure" in which boss fights were the high point, and saying the arena makes it easier to negotiate PvP, but criticizing the team and deathmatch multiplayer modes as hard to find enough players for. Official Xbox Magazine rated it the same, saying that it is for "hardcore players only" and a "fantastic addition to an already great game", calling buying it a "no-brainer" for fans.

Tom McShea of GameSpot stated that the DLC "respected the relationship between developers and players" by presenting a "bonus" that added to the game's depth rather than an "insidious strategy to pad the company's coffers".

References 

Video game downloadable content
2012 video games
Action role-playing video games
Dark Souls
FromSoftware games
Bandai Namco games
Fantasy video games
Video games developed in Japan
Video games featuring protagonists of selectable gender
Windows games
Xbox 360 games
PlayStation 3 games
Soulslike video games
Video games scored by Motoi Sakuraba